Annelize Naudé (born 1 January 1977) is a professional squash player from the Netherlands. She reached a career-high world ranking of World No. 13 in January 2006, and has won five WISPA tour titles as well as having been the runner-up nine times since 1996.

Professional career
Naudé's international squash career began in 1996; her world ranking after her first year was No. 53. She climbed up the rankings to No. 36 two years later, but her rankings then fell to a career low of No. 86 in May 2000. Her ranking rose again to No. 25 in late 2001, and she reached No. 20 a year later. She achieved her career best ranking of No. 13 four years later, in January 2006.

Naudé reached her first final in an international tournament in 1999 in the Danish Open, but she was subsequently defeated by Pamela Nimmo. Naudé won her first professional title in 2002, also in the Danish Open, when she beats Senga Macfie in the final which lasts in five sets 3–9, 4–9, 9–5, 9–3, 9–4. She then had to wait for two years for her second title, this time in the Swiss Open, beating Laura-Jane Lengthorn in the final. Naudé then lost to former world No. 1 Vanessa Atkinson in the final of Mexican Open.

Naudé appeared in her 12th WISPA World Tour final at the Internationaux de Creteil in France; she then won the match by beating England’s Lauren Siddall to her fourth title of her career.

Personal life
Naudé grew up in South Africa before moving to the Netherlands. She was based at Kempton Park Country Club, and was coached in her early days by Phillip Schelbusch and Jean Grainger, which took her to national titles at various junior levels before she moved to Amsterdam and eventually took on Dutch nationality and become a fixture in their national team.

Annelize is currently busy following her other passion in life, music. Since retiring from squash at the end of 2010, she is a qualified audio engineer and well established dj.

Career statistics
Listed as the following:-

Professional Tour Titles (5)
All Results for Annelize Naudé in WISPA World's Tour tournament

WISPA Tour Finals (runner-up) (9)

References

External links

Official Website

Dutch female squash players
Living people
1977 births
People from Kempton Park, Gauteng
Sportspeople from Gauteng